American Family, sometimes called American Family: Journey of Dreams is a PBS series created by Gregory Nava that follows the lives of a Latino  family in Los Angeles. This was the first broadcast television drama series featuring a predominantly Latino cast. It also was the first original primetime American episodic drama to air on PBS in decades—since the series I'll Fly Away moved to the network.

Production
Nava initially created the series for CBS, which passed on the pilot. PBS picked up 12 remaining episodes for its first season. The second season aired in mid-2004 with a slight name change. When it had initially aired in January 2002, it was simply known as American Family. Nava envisioned the second season as an epic story in 13 parts that featured current events as well as how the family was involved in the Mexican Revolution.

Edward James Olmos plays Jess Gonzalez, a Korean War veteran and barber with a cranky disposition as well as five adult children. He and his wife Berta (Sônia Braga) seek a better life for their children. Conrado is a medical school student, who, at the end of the first season, enlists in the Army.

Themes
The series addressed the ongoing war in Iraq head-on. In its first episodes Conrado is set to deploy to Kuwait. Melanie McFarland, television critic for the Seattle Post-Intelligencer, stated that "Gregory Nava ventures into territory no other scripted television show has meaningfully addressed -- the Iraq War. Since audiences seek escapism in their shows instead of more reminders that U.S. soldiers are still dying over in Iraq, shying from the topic might be understandable. Network TV is ailing right now, and anything which might be perceived as too heavy to draw in viewers probably wouldn't fly."

In an interview with Bill Moyers during the airing of the series, Nava was asked if he was not angry that Latinos were invisible during prime-time television. "I think we’re reaching a point right now where Latinos are moving from the fringes into the mainstream of American life. And our time has come right now for us to make our contribution to this country," he said. "So it doesn’t make me angry; I just see it as a challenge. And I think that as a population and as a community we have to rise to that challenge."

Cast
Edward James Olmos as Jess Gonzalez
Sônia Braga as Berta Gonzalez
Esai Morales as Esteban Gonzalez
Michael Peña as Teenage Esteban
Kurt Caceres as Conrado Gonzalez
Nicholas Gonzalez as Teenage Conrado
Constance Marie as Nina Gonzalez
Aimee Garcia as Teenage Nina
Rachel Ticotin as Evangelina "Vangie" Gonzalez
Alisa Reyes as Teenage Vangie
AJ Lamas as Cisco Gonzalez
Raquel Welch as Aunt Dora
David Villalpando as Cruz

References

Sources
http://www.pbs.org/americanfamily/series.html
Zurawik, David. Strong family drama with a Latino accent, The Baltimore Sun, January 20, 2002. Accessed August 31, 2015.
http://www.seattlepi.com/tv/167149_tv01.html
https://web.archive.org/web/20110927160654/http://www.uni-bielefeld.de/(cen,en)/ZIF/FG/2008Pluribus/fellows/raab_nava.pdf
http://www.pbs.org/now/transcript/transcript_nava.html
 The Washington Post

External links

2000s American drama television series
2002 American television series debuts
2004 American television series endings
PBS original programming
Television shows set in Los Angeles